Hashcheh-ye Olya (also Romanized as Ḩashcheh-ye ‘Olyā and Hashcheh-ye ‘Olyā; also known as Haitcha, Ḩashcheh, Ḩashcheh-ye Bālā, Hashcheh-ye Dovvom, Hashjeh-ye ‘Olyā, and Soveyreh-ye ‘Olyā) is a village in Jarahi Rural District, in the Central District of Mahshahr County, Khuzestan Province, Iran. At the 2006 census, its population was 220, in 39 families.

References 

Populated places in Mahshahr County